James Emanuel "Jeb" Boasberg (born February 20, 1963) is the chief judge of the United States District Court for the District of Columbia. He served as the Presiding Judge of the United States Foreign Intelligence Surveillance Court from 2020 to 2021 and is a former associate judge on the Superior Court of the District of Columbia.

Early life and education
Boasberg was born in San Francisco, California, in 1963, to Sarah Margaret (née Szold) and Emanuel Boasberg III. The family moved to Washington, D.C. when Boasberg's father accepted a position in Sargent Shriver's Office of Economic Opportunity, a Great Society agency responsible for implementing and administering many of Lyndon B. Johnson's War on Poverty programs.
Boasberg received a Bachelor of Arts from Yale University in 1985, where he was a member of Skull and Bones, and a Master of Studies the following year from St Peter's College, Oxford. He then earned his Juris Doctor from Yale Law School in 1990.

Clerkship and legal career
After completing law school, Boasberg served as a law clerk for Judge Dorothy W. Nelson of the United States Court of Appeals for the Ninth Circuit for the 1990–91 term. He then went into private practice, working at firms first in San Francisco (1991–94) and then in the District of Columbia (1995–96). In 1996, Boasberg joined the office of the United States Attorney for the District of Columbia where he would spend 5.5 years as a prosecutor, specializing in homicides.

Judicial service
In September 2002, Boasberg became an Associate Judge of the Superior Court of the District of Columbia, having been appointed by President George W. Bush.   He served in the Civil and Criminal Divisions, and the Domestic Violence Branch, until his appointment to the federal bench in 2011. During the 111th Congress, Delegate Eleanor Holmes Norton recommended Boasberg to fill a judicial vacancy on the United States District Court for the District of Columbia. On June 17, 2010, President Barack Obama formally nominated Boasberg to the District Court for the District of Columbia.  Boasberg was confirmed on March 14, 2011 by a 96–0 vote. He received his commission on March 17, 2011. He became the Chief Judge on March 17, 2023. 

Boasberg is considered a feeder judge, sending numerous clerks to the Supreme Court.

Appointment to United States Foreign Intelligence Surveillance Court 
On February 7, 2014, Chief Justice John G. Roberts announced that he would appoint Boasberg to the United States Foreign Intelligence Surveillance Court for a term starting May 18, 2014 to a seat being vacated by Reggie Walton. His term began May 18, 2014. On December 20, 2019, the FISC announced he will replace the Presiding Judge FISC January 1, 2020 and elevated to preside. His term as presiding judge and judge of the FISC ended on May 19, 2021.

Appointment to Alien Terrorist Removal court 

In 2020, he was appointed to the United States Alien Terrorist Removal Court and designated Chief Judge.

Notable rulings

Osama Bin Laden photos 
On April 26, 2012, Boasberg ruled that the public had no right to view government photos of a deceased Osama Bin Laden. Judicial Watch, a conservative legal group, had filed a request under the Freedom of Information Act (FOIA), but were unsuccessful in convincing the Judge that FOIA rights outweighed national-security factors.

Registered tax return preparer regulations 
On January 18, 2013, Boasberg issued a permanent injunction prohibiting the Internal Revenue Service from enforcing regulations on Registered Tax Return Preparers, which otherwise required tax return preparers to register with the IRS and pass a written test as evidence of competency. Loving v. Internal Revenue Service, No. 12-385 (U.S.D.C. D.C. 1/18/2013).  The IRS appealed and in 2014, the Court of Appeals upheld Boasberg's district court decision.

Hillary Clinton emails 
On August 22, 2016, Boasberg ordered the release of over 14,000 emails found in the United States Department of State correspondence of Hillary Clinton by the FBI during an investigation of Clinton's private server. These emails were requested by Judicial Watch, a conservative legal group, because the FBI had indicated that emails were work-related and not entirely private as Clinton had previously said.

Trump tax returns 
On August 18, 2017, Boasberg dismissed a lawsuit from the Electronic Privacy Information Center (EPIC), which had sued the IRS under FOIA seeking President Donald Trump's personal tax returns from 2010 to the present to be released. Boasberg concluded that because personal tax returns are confidential, they may only be obtained either by permission from Trump himself or if Congress's Joint Committee on Taxation signed off to allow the disclosure.

Medicaid work rules
On March 27, 2019, Boasberg blocked a work requirement for recipients of Medicaid in Arkansas and Kentucky.

Dakota Access Pipeline
On March 25, 2020, Boasberg ordered a sweeping new environmental review by the Army Corps of Engineers of the Dakota Access Pipeline.

In a subsequent decision on July 6, 2020, he vacated an easement to cross the Missouri River pending completion of the environmental review and ordered the pipeline to be emptied within 30 days. On August 5, a three-judge panel of the United States Court of Appeals for the District of Columbia Circuit upheld the ruling regarding the easement; however, the judges vacated the order to empty the pipeline and asked the Army Corps of Engineers to submit a follow-up brief on whether they would allow continued pipeline operation without the easement.

North Atlantic Right Whale
On April 9, 2020, Boasberg issued an opinion finding that the National Marine Fisheries Service violated the Endangered Species Act when it issued a Biological Opinion in 2014 allowing for the accidental killings of North Atlantic right whales (of which only about 400 remain as of April 8, 2020) by the American lobster fishery, which consists of seven areas spanning the East Coast from Maine to North Carolina.

Personal life
Boasberg married Elizabeth Leslie Manson in 1991. His brother, Tom Boasberg, succeeded Michael Bennet as Superintendent of Denver Public Schools after Colorado Governor Bill Ritter appointed Bennet to the United States Senate in January 2009.

He is an aficionado of William Shakespeare's plays.  In February 2018, he played a crown prosecutor in The Trial of Hamlet that was presented at the Shakespeare Theatre Company.

See also
Medicaid expansion
Efforts to repeal the Patient Protection and Affordable Care Act

References

External links

Biography of Judge Boasberg at the Superior Court

|-

|-

|-

1963 births
21st-century American judges
Alumni of St Peter's College, Oxford
Assistant United States Attorneys
Judges of the Superior Court of the District of Columbia
Judges of the United States District Court for the District of Columbia
Judges of the United States Foreign Intelligence Surveillance Court
Living people
United States district court judges appointed by Barack Obama
Yale Law School alumni